The Upper Grand District School Board (known as English-language Public District School Board No. 18 prior to 1999) is a school board in Ontario, Canada. It spans an area of 4211 km² and serves approximately 35,000 students through 65 elementary schools and 11 secondary schools in the regions of Dufferin County, Wellington County and the City of Guelph, in the region to the west and north of Toronto.

Student success is the goal of over 4,000 dedicated teaching and support staff who are aided by the contributions of caring volunteers and community partners.

The board has 10 elected trustees and 2 student trustees. The 2022-23 budget (Operating only) is $432,285,649.

Multi-Year Plan 
In June 2022, the Board of Trustees approved the UGDSB's Multi-Year Plan 2022-2026. A school board’s MYP establishes the key directions that guide the organization’s actions for the students and communities that it serves. The 2022-2026 Multi-Year Plan established the following priorities:

UGDSB's Purpose: To inspire a love of learning and develop engaged, globally literate citizens.

UGDSB's Vision: To be recognized as leaders in creating unparalleled, agile, and inclusive learning experiences for all.

UGDSB's Plan:

We will…

 Deliver foundational education and student achievement

We will…

 Inspire a love of lifelong learning
 Champion health and wellbeing
 Ensure equity of access and outcomes
 Lead through sustainability

We will…

 Foster engaging and supportive learning environments
 Strengthen and grow community relationships
 Continuously learn, evaluate and improve

Kindergarten and Full Day Early Learning Kindergarten 
Kindergarten is a two-year program that includes Junior (year 1) and Senior (year 2) Kindergarten.

In September 2010, the Board began offering the full day kindergarten program in some schools as part of a province wide implementation plan. As of the 2014-2015 school year, all elementary schools offer Full Day Kindergarten (FDK). At these schools, JK and SK children attend all day every day, Monday to Friday.

French as a Second Language (FSL)
The board offers two FSL programs – Core French and French Immersion.

Core French is mandatory from Grades 4 to 8 for all students in English-language elementary schools. At the secondary level, students can take French as a subject from Grades 9 - 12. It is mandatory that students take one French credit for the Ontario Secondary School Diploma.

French Immersion offers students the opportunity to acquire a high level of proficiency in French while maintaining and developing English language skills. French Immersion is available in 19 elementary schools and four high schools.

Secondary schools
Secondary schools are listed below:

 Centennial Collegiate Vocational Institute (Guelph)
 Centre Dufferin District High School (Dufferin County)
 Centre Wellington District High School (Wellington County)
 College Heights Secondary School (Guelph)
 Erin District High School (Wellington County)
 Guelph Collegiate Vocational Institute (Guelph)
 John F. Ross Collegiate Vocational Institute (Guelph)
 Norwell District Secondary School (Wellington County)
 Orangeville District Secondary School (Dufferin County)
 Wellington Heights Secondary School (Wellington County)
 Westside Secondary School (Dufferin County)
 ECPP (Education and Community Partnership Programs), Youth Options and SAL (Supervised Alternative Learning)

In January 2018, The Upper Grand District School Board announced new plans to build a secondary school northwest of the Victoria Road at Arkell Road intersection. The project is a part of Ontario's Ministry of Education's plan to build 30 new schools across the province and renovate 40 others.  The new secondary school is expected to provide relief for the overpopulated Centennial C.V.I. high school. it is designed to accommodate 900 students and will cost the provincial government an estimated $25.5 million.

Educational options
The district offers various alternative programs for high school students, including the Community Environmental Leadership Program (CELP), Headwaters, and da Vinci Arts & Science Environmental Leadership Program.

As part of Career/Life planning programming, Upper Grand DSB offers four immersive experiential programs for students in grades 7-12+ that promote learning through exploration, investigation, and active participation. Choosing a program based on their skills and ambitions, students can explore and build skills related to a variety of careers both within and outside of the classroom with full assistance and support, easing the transition as they move on to post-secondary education, whether in an apprenticeship, college or university.

Career Pathways Exploration Programs:

 Co-operative Education
 Dual Credit
 Ontario Youth Apprenticeship Program (OYAP)
 Specialist High Skills Major (SHSM)

Elementary schools

See also
Wellington Catholic District School Board
Dufferin-Peel Catholic District School Board
List of school districts in Ontario
List of high schools in Ontario

References

External links
Upper Grand District School Board (official site)

School districts in Ontario
Education in Guelph